(English: Women's first division) is the second-tier basketball competition among clubs in Iceland.

History

On 13 March 2020, the rest of the 2019–20 season was postponed due to the coronavirus outbreak in Iceland.

Format
The team with the best record is be crowned first division champion. The top two teams then play a best–of–three playoff for a promotion to the Úrvalsdeild.

Teams
The current first-division teams for the 2021–22 season are:

Past winners

1984–1985: Keflavík
1993–1994: Breiðablik
1994–1995: Víðir
1995–1996: Skallagrímur
1996–1997: Skallagrímur
1997–1998: Tindastóll
1998–1999: Tindastóll
1999–2000: Njarðvík
2000–2001: Njarðvík
2001–2002: Haukar
2002–2003: ÍR
2003–2004: Haukar
2004–2005: Breiðablik
2005–2006: Hamar/Selfoss
2006–2007: Fjölnir
2007–2008: Snæfell
2008–2009: Njarðvík
2009–2010: Fjölnir
2010–2011: Stjarnan
2011–2012: Grindavík
2012–2013: Hamar
2013–2014: Breiðablik
2014–2015: Njarðvík
2015–2016: Skallagrímur
2016–2017: Þór Akureyri
2017–2018: KR
2018–2019: Fjölnir
2019–2020: Fjölnir
2020–2021: Njarðvík
2021–2022: Ármann
2022–2023: Stjarnan

Awards and honors

Individual awards

Domestic All-First team

References

External links
Schedules and scores at Icelandic Basketball Association

women
Iceland
Women's basketball competitions in Iceland
Sports leagues established in 1984
1984 establishments in Iceland
Professional sports leagues in Iceland